John Argyle (1911–1962) was a British screenwriter, producer and film director.

Selected filmography
Director
 The Last Tide (1931)
 Paradise Alley (1931)
 The Final Reckoning (1932)
 This Man Is Dangerous (1941)
 Send for Paul Temple (1946)
 The Hills of Donegal (1947)

Producer
 Love's Old Sweet Song (1933)
 Variety (1935)
 Wanted by Scotland Yard (1937)
 My Irish Molly (1938)
 Tower of Terror (1941)

References

External links
 

1911 births
1962 deaths
British film directors
People from Tamworth, Staffordshire